Bankati is a village in Kanksa CD block  in the Durgapur subdivision of the Paschim Bardhaman district in the Indian state of West Bengal.

Geography

Urbanisation
According to the 2011 census, 79.22% of the population of the Durgapur subdivision was urban and 20.78% was rural. The Durgapur subdivision has 1 municipal corporation at Durgapur and 38 (+1 partly) census towns (partly presented in the map alongside; all places marked on the map are linked in the full-screen map).

Location

Demographics
According to the 2011 Census of India, Bankati had a toal population of 1,255 of which 650 (52%) were males and 605 (48%) were females. Population in the age range 0–6 years was 125. The total number of literate persons in Bankati was 880 (71.50% of the population over 6 years).

*For language details see Kanksa (community development block)#Language and religion

Education
Eklabya Model School  (residential) is a Hindi-medium coeducational institution established in 2002. It has facilities forteaching from class VI to class XII. The school has a library with 81 books and a playground.

Ajodhya High School is a Bengali-medium coeducational school established in 1957. It has facilities for teaching from class V to class XII.

Culture
There is a 15 feet high bell metal (pital) chariot at Bankati, built in the 19th century. Designed in the style of a pancharatna temple it has carvings on its body. Bankati has two Shiva temples - Gopeswar Shiva Temple built in 1155 and Pancha Ratna Shiva temple built in 1782.

David J. McCutchion mentions a Shiva Temple at Bankati built in 1832. It is described as a standard type pancharatna temple with bridged rekha turrets and single entrance and terracotta decoration.

Gallery

References

Villages in Paschim Bardhaman district